Thomas Baddeley (2 November 1874 – 24 September 1946) was an England international footballer who played as a goalkeeper. In his playing career, Baddeley made over 350 league appearances, and also earned five caps. After starting his career in the English Football League with Burslem Port Vale, he spent 1896 to 1907 at Wolverhampton Wanderers, and then ended his career with spells at Bradford Park Avenue and Stoke.

Early and personal life
Thomas Baddeley was born on 30 October 1874 in Bycars, near Burslem, Staffordshire. He worked as a baker. He married Phoebe Anne Blackham in 1904, and had three sons: Sydney, Thomas (who died in 1910 at the age of three), and Tom (born 1912). He was working as a potters turner in 1911. According to the 1921 census, he worked as a beer seller and employed a servant, though by 1939 was unemployed. He died on 24 September 1946 and was buried at Burslem cemetery with his son, Tom, and wife.

Playing career

Burslem Port Vale
Baddeley began his professional career with Burslem Port Vale in 1893 after joining the club from local non-League side Burslem Swifts. He played two Second Division games in the 1893–94 season, as Joe Frail and Hugh Mackay shared the number one jersey. Baddeley then established himself between the sticks to become an ever-present at the Athletic Ground during the 1894–95 and 1895–96 seasons. However he was suspended by the club in August 1896 after signing professional forms with another club, and was sold on to Wolverhampton Wanderers in October 1896 for £50.

Wolverhampton Wanderers
He broke through into the first team the following year, making his league debut on 1 September 1897 in a 3–0 win over Preston North End. The team went on to finish third in 1897–98, eighth in 1898–99, and fourth in 1899–1900. In his first three years at Wolves, he kept 31 clean sheets. Conversely Baddeley was also in goal in 1900 when Wolves were sensationally knocked out of the FA Cup by Queens Park Rangers at home. Wolves went on to finish 13th in 1900–01, 14th in 1901–02, 11th in 1902–03, eighth in 1903–04, and 14th again in 1904–05, before suffering relegation in last place in 1905–06 after conceding 99 goals in 38 games. They then went on to post a sixth-place finish in the Second Division in 1906–07.

Later career
After making a total of 315 appearances in an 11-year stay at Molineux, he left Wolves in 1907 for Southern League side Bradford Park Avenue. They finished 13th in 1907–08, and were then elected into the English Football League. He played in their first-ever league match in September 1908, as the club went on to finish in 16th place in 1908–09 and 10th place in 1909–10. However, he returned to the Midlands with Stoke after failing to become a regular in the Bradford team. His stay at the Victoria Ground proved short though and he played seven Birmingham & District League games in the 1909–10 season before he dropped into non-league action with nearby Whitfield Colliery, before retiring in May 1911.

International career
Baddeley made his England debut on 14 February 1903, in a 4–0 win over Ireland at his home club ground of Molineux. He won four further caps over the next fourteen months, playing against Scotland (twice), Wales, and Ireland again.

Career statistics

Club statistics
Source:

International statistics

Honours
England
British Home Championship: 1902–03 (shared), 1903–04

References

1874 births
1946 deaths
Sportspeople from Burslem
English footballers
England international footballers
Association football goalkeepers
Port Vale F.C. players
Wolverhampton Wanderers F.C. players
Bradford (Park Avenue) A.F.C. players
Stoke City F.C. players
English Football League players
Midland Football League players
Southern Football League players
English Football League representative players